Iodine monofluoride is an interhalogen compound of iodine and fluorine with formula IF.  It is a chocolate-brown solid that decomposes at 0 °C, disproportionating to elemental iodine and iodine pentafluoride:

5 IF → 2 I2 + IF5

However, its molecular properties can still be precisely determined by spectroscopy: the iodine-fluorine distance is 190.9 pm and the I−F bond dissociation energy is around 277 kJ mol−1.  At 298 K, its standard enthalpy change of formation is ΔHf° = −95.4 kJ mol−1, and its Gibbs free energy is ΔGf° = −117.6 kJ mol−1.

It can be generated, albeit only fleetingly, by the reaction of the elements at −45 °C in CCl3F:

I2 + F2 → 2 IF

It can also be generated by the reaction of iodine with iodine trifluoride at −78 °C in CCl3F:

I2 + IF3 → 3 IF

The reaction of iodine with silver(I) fluoride at 0 °C also yields iodine monofluoride:

I2 + AgF → IF + AgI

Reactions
Iodine monofluoride is used to produce pure nitrogen triiodide:

BN + 3 IF → NI3 + BF3

See also
 Iodine trifluoride
 Iodine pentafluoride
 Iodine heptafluoride

References

Interhalogen compounds
Diatomic molecules
Iodine compounds
Fluorides